"Scared to Be Lonely" is a song recorded by Dutch DJ Martin Garrix and English singer Dua Lipa. It was written by Garrix, Giorgio Tuinfort, Nathaniel Campany, Kyle Shearer, and Georgia Ku, while the production was handled by Garrix, Tuinfort, Valley Girl, and Lorna Blackwood. The song was released for digital download and streaming as a standalone single on 27 January 2017 by Stmpd Rcrds and Epic Records, after being premiered by Garrix at the 2017 AVA Festival a month earlier. It was later included on Dua Lipa: Complete Edition (2018), the super deluxe reissue of Lipa's eponymous debut studio album.

"Scared to Be Lonely" is a future bass track with electro and emo-EDM elements. Lyrically, the song sees Lipa singing about the ending of a relationship. The song was met with widespread critical acclaim from music critics, who praised Lipa's vocals and the song's emotive production, while the song also became a commercial success, reaching the top 10 of charts in 12 countries worldwide, including Garrix's native region of the Netherlands, reaching the third position. It additionally reached number 14 and 76, respectively, on the UK Singles Chart and US Billboard Hot 100. The song has since been certified platinum or higher in 15 territories, including quadruple platinum awards in Norway and Sweden as well as a triple platinum award in the Netherlands.

The music video for "Scared to Be Lonely" was directed by Blake Claridge and filmed in Scotland. It features Garrix walking around a landscape, reminiscing about past relationships, while Lipa sings in a forest. The two further promoted the song in 2017 with live performances at Capital FM's the Jingle Bell Ball, the Coachella Valley Music and Arts Festival, and on The Tonight Show Starring Jimmy Fallon. Two remix EPs and an acoustic version were released. The EPs include remixes by Brooks, DubVision, and Loud Luxury.

Background and recording
Following the release of a club record in his third extended play Seven (2016), Martin Garrix wanted to return to the more pop-leaning sound of his single "In the Name of Love" (2016) with Bebe Rexha. In order to create a follow-up to the song, Garrix had an A&R meeting with his record label, Stmpd Rcrds and Epic Records, that featured seven new songs with potential. "Scared to Be Lonely" was then crafted as a completely new idea. It was written by Garrix, Giorgio Tuinfort, Nathaniel Campany, Kyle Shearer, and Georgia Ku. The song's production was handled by Garrix, Valley Girl, Tuinfort, and Lorna Blackwood. Engineering was done by Garrix, JP Negrete, and Cameron Gower-Poole, while Frank van Essen contributed the arrangement, violin, and strings. The song was recorded at The Record Plant in Hollywood and Studio Strings Attached in Collendoorn, the Netherlands.

Garrix had a rough demo with a chord progression before going in search of a vocalist, with several artists recording demos before Dua Lipa. She had been on Garrix's wishlist of collaborators, with him reaching out to Lipa's management in hope she would record it. Lipa expressed her admiration of the song and recorded a demo, which she re-recorded after Garrix gave her feedback. After receiving Lipa's final version, Garrix went back into the studio and polished off the song, editing the melodies and incorporating lots of live instrumentation with real strings. Lipa and Garrix had been introduced by mutual connections, but did not meet in person during the recording of the song.

Music and lyrics

Musically, "Scared to Be Lonely" is a future bass track with elements of electro and emo-EDM. It runs for 3:40, and follows a structure of verse, bridge, chorus, drop, verse, bridge, chorus, drop, middle eight, chorus, drop. The song is set in the time signature of  time and is composed in the key of C minor, with a tempo of 138 beats per minute and a chord progression of A(add9)—Cm7/E—B(add4)—Gm(6). It opens with "ghostly" electronic strings and a "charming" piano melody, before synths and sparse percussion items come in. The percussion leads the song towards the simple synth hook. Finger snaps are used in the middle eight.

The song uses an upbeat, pop-ready, future bass, and dance production with an emotive tone. The production also consists of a beat that has trap vibes ever so often, emotive strings, "boisterous" bass notes, and "tantalizing" hi-hats. Each production element builds up to the drop, where the piano melody becomes electronic. Lipa uses soulful vocals that range from B3 to G5, and she makes use of belting. Lyrically, the song documents the ending of a relationship, with Lipa pondering whether it is legit.

Release and promotion
Garrix premiered "Scared to Be Lonely" at the 2017 AVA Festival in Myanmar on New Year's Eve. The song's artwork leaked on 19 January 2017; it features the two artists standing side by side on a hill, with Garrix looking at Lipa, similarly to the cover art for "In the Name of Love", and a countryside back drop. They formally announced the single on 25 January 2017, revealing a snippet of the song as well as one of its music video. The following day, the song leaked online. It was released for digital download and streaming on 27 January 2017, through Epic Records and Stmpd Rcrds. The song was sent for radio airplay in Italy a week later. "Scared to Be Lonely" was later included as the sixth track on the second disc of the reissue of Lipa's eponymous debut studio album Dua Lipa: Complete Edition, released on 19 October 2018 by Warner Bros Records.

On 22 March 2017, Lipa and Garrix performed "Scared to Be Lonely" on The Tonight Show Starring Jimmy Fallon. Garrix played a guitar while Lipa danced around the stage and sang to Garrix. During his 15 April 2017 set at the Coachella Valley Music and Arts Festival, Garrix brought out Lipa to perform the song. Lipa performed the song for Capital FM's the Jingle Bell Ball on 9 December 2017. The song was included on the setlist of Lipa's Self-Titled Tour (2017–18).

Reception
"Scared to Be Lonely" was met with acclaim from music critics. For The 405, Sean Ward compared it to Lipa's "No Goodbyes" (2017), while labelling the song a "mega-collab," and noting its "dance ecstasy." Sebas E. Alonso of Jenesaispop thought the song is reminiscent of the Chainsmokers as well as the tropical house of Lipa's own "Hotter than Hell" (2016). He went on to put forward the song's potential to be a bonus track on Dua Lipa, as it does not succumb to dembow, dancehall, or trap styles. In a positive review from Dancing Astronaut, Haylee Graham said the song was "well worth the wait" and praised Lipa's "velvet-smooth vocals" that emphasize the "feels." She continued by complimenting the "heart-rending" lyrics and how Garrix has proven he is worthy of his dance music industry vanguard status. In a separate Dancing Astronaut review, Kassi Chrys viewed that the song shows Garrix's "true artistry."

In her review for Time, Raisa Bruner named "Scared to Be Lonely" a "thoughtful ballad" that converts into a "slow-burning banger," while also praising the space given for Lipa's vocals to "shine." Billboards David Rishty and Kat Bein ranked it as Garrix's third best song, behind "In The Name of Love" and "Animals" (2013). The two of them saw the strength in the song's subtlety and commended Lipa's "beautiful" vocals. They also praised Garrix's production, calling the drop "warm" and the beat "steady." David Renshaw of The Fader labelled the song a "dramatic EDM banger," while Idolators Robbie Daw described it as a "slow-paced EDM track" and commended the "pretty stellar" middle eight. "Scared to Be Lonely" was nominated for Single of the Year at the 2017 Electronic Music Awards and won Best Bass Track at the 2018 WDM Radio Awards.

Commercial performance
"Scared to Be Lonely" debuted at number five on the Netherlands' Dutch Single Top 100 chart dated 4 February 2017. Two weeks later, it rose to a peak of number three, spending two weeks at the peak and 32 weeks on the chart. On the Dutch Top 40, the song spent 21 weeks on the chart, debuting at number 29 and attaining a peak position of number 2 in its sixth week. The song reached the summit of the Dutch Dance Top 30 chart, and lasted a total of 74 weeks on it. In September 2018, the song was awarded a triple platinum certification by the Nederlandse Vereniging van Producenten en Importeurs van beeld – en geluidsdragers (NVPI) for track-equivalent sales of 120,000 units in the Netherlands.

On the UK Singles Chart, "Scared to Be Lonely" debuted at number 23 on the issue dated 3 February 2017. The following week, it rose to a peak of number 14 on the chart, spending two weeks at the position. In both weeks that the song was at its peak, Lipa had three songs in the top 15 of the UK Singles Chart with "Be the One" (2015) and "No Lie" (2016) by Sean Paul featuring Lipa. "Scared to be Lonely" spent a total of 22 weeks on the chart. The song also entered the UK Dance Singles Chart, where it peaked at number two. For track-equivalent sales of 600,000 units in the United Kingdom, the song was awarded a double platinum certification by the British Phonographic Industry (BPI) in August 2021.

In the United States, "Scared to Be Lonely" debuted at number 88 on the Billboard Hot 100 chart issue dated 18 February 2017. It spent 14 non-consecutive weeks on the chart, and eventually peaked at number 76. In December 2020, the Recording Industry Association of America (RIAA) awarded the song a double platinum certification for selling 2,000,000 track-equivalent units in the US. "Scared to Be Lonely" further reached the top 10 of charts in Austria, Belgium (Flanders), the Czech Republic, Denmark, Finland, Germany, Hungary, Malaysia, New Zealand, Norway, Portugal, Scotland, Slovakia, Sweden, and Switzerland. The song has been certified diamond in Mexico, quadruple platinum in Norway and Sweden, respectively, triple platinum in Poland, and triple platinum in Australia, Canada, and Italy, respectively.

Music videos

The music video for "Scared to Be Lonely" was directed by Blake Claridge and released alongside the song. After receiving notice of the music video, the service production company LS Productions went in search of an expansive landscape with Scandinavian-looking wood and a house. The company sourced several potential locations around Scotland, eventually choosing a Category B-listed 19th century building in Dumfries and Galloway. The music video production team enlisted the help of Flying Pictures to shoot the video with drones. Two drone teams were used, one to supply a bright light on Garrix that emphasizes his character's loneliness, and one to actually film the video with an Alexa camera.

The video was filmed over the course of two days, and includes non-actor cast members. The meaning behind it comes from the moments in which a partner contemplates staying in a relationship or leaving. The video features Garrix wandering around the landscape while reminiscing about past relationships. The past and present are distinguished between aspect ratios, with the past containing scenes of Garrix accompanied by partners in a bedroom, a steamy shower, and a car. While all this is happening, Lipa sings in a dark forest with a bright light behind her. The visual closes with Garrix looking at the floor in a house, before someone touches his shoulder and he turns around. A Jake Jelicich-directed music video for the song's acoustic version was released on 7 April 2017. It features a live performance of Garrix and Lipa in a studio with lens flares and film grain.

Remixes
"Scared to Be Lonely" has been accompanied by several remixes. Two remix EPs were released, one on 17 March 2017 and the other a week later. Brooks' festival house remix has simple verses that contain just a powerful atmosphere and Lipa's vocals, while the funky synths and festival melodies encapsulate the choruses that drop heavily. On their remix, DubVision created a progressive house track that has a big build and bouncy drop. The Zonderling remix adds groovy elements with heavy synths. Alpharock's remix is a drum and bass track with beats of the same genre, and an increased tempo. The tech house remix by Funkin Matt introduces "catchy" bass stabs and subtle melodies. Julien Earle's remix was described as an "emotional" house rendition.

Gigamesh's remix was noted for its solid atmospheres. Medasin chills down the song to create a future bass remix with euphoric elements. His production uses big saw chords, ambient pads, and plucks with soft attack and drum patterns, while also introducing new melodies for the drop. Loud Luxury's remix fuses deep house, tech house, and future house elements. Conro's future bass remix has a clean production with cascading synths that glide over Lipa's vocals. The LOOPERS remix makes use of funky 8-bit sounds. On his remix, Joe Mason featured drums and guitars, as well as incorporating lush synths. He additionally re-pitched Lipa's vocals and created an entirely new drop.

An acoustic version of the song was released on 6 April 2020. It features an orchestra, strings, and percussive instruments, while Garrix plays the song's melody on an electric guitar. Lipa had wanted to do an acoustic version for a while, and her vocals are the forefront. The staff of Dancing Astronaut thought that the track shows Garrix's "true versatility" and "artistic abilities," while Myles Tanzer of The Fader commended the "gorgeous" string section.

Track listings

Digital download and streaming
"Scared to Be Lonely" – 3:40

Digital EP – remixes, volume 1
"Scared to Be Lonely" (Brooks remix) – 3:20
"Scared to Be Lonely" (DubVision remix) – 3:10
"Scared to Be Lonely" (Zonderling remix) – 3:54
"Scared to Be Lonely" (Alpharock remix) – 3:55
"Scared to Be Lonely" (Funkin Matt remix) – 3:38
"Scared to Be Lonely" (Julien Earle remix) – 5:20

Digital download and streaming – Brooks extended remix
"Scared to Be Lonely" (Brooks extended remix) – 4:35

Digital download and streaming – DubVision extended remix
"Scared to Be Lonely" (DubVision extended remix) – 4:39

Digital download and streaming – Zonderling extended remix
"Scared to Be Lonely" (Zonderling extended remix) – 4:50

Digital EP – remixes, volume 2
"Scared to Be Lonely" (Gigamesh remix) – 3:49
"Scared to Be Lonely" (Medasin remix) – 3:32
"Scared to Be Lonely" (Loud Luxury remix) – 3:27
"Scared to Be Lonely" (Conro remix) – 3:22
"Scared to Be Lonely" (LOOPERS remix) – 4:11
"Scared to Be Lonely" (Joe Mason remix) – 3:27

Digital download and streaming – Loud Luxury extended remix
"Scared to Be Lonely" (Loud Luxury extended remix) – 3:57

Digital download and streaming – acoustic version
"Scared to Be Lonely" (acoustic version) – 4:17

Personnel
 Martin Garrix production, engineering 
 Dua Lipa vocals
 Valley Girl production
 Giorgio Tuinfort production
 Lorna Blackwood production
 JP Negrete engineering 
 Cameron Gower-Poole engineering
 Frank van Essen arrangement, violin, strings

Charts

Weekly charts

Year-end charts

Certifications

Release history

See also
 List of Platinum singles in the United Kingdom awarded since 2000
 List of top 10 singles in 2017 (Germany)

Footnotes

References

External links
 
 
 
 Lyrics of this song at Musixmatch

Songs about loneliness
Future bass songs
Martin Garrix songs
Dua Lipa songs
2017 singles
Songs written by Martin Garrix
Songs written by Giorgio Tuinfort
2017 songs
Stmpd Rcrds singles
Epic Records singles
Songs written by Nate Campany
Songs written by Georgia Ku